Kids: Fun Stuff To Do Together was a children's magazine published in the mid-2000s (unrelated to the earlier Kids magazine of the 1970s). Kids, which was originally launched in 2001 as Martha Stewart Kids, specialized in projects that children could make, either by themselves or along with their parents. It was published quarterly by Martha Stewart Living Omnimedia. Kids was also a winner of the prestigious 2005 and 2006 National Magazine Award for Design, and in 2005 for Photography by the American Society of Magazine Editors.

On March 1, 2006, the publishers of Kids announced that the company decided to discontinue the full-sized quarterly magazine with the Spring 2006 issue in favor for a new digest sized publication, Good Things for Kids, which will be published biannually and carries no advertising. Current readers were given the option to subscribe to Everyday Food for the remainder of their subscription.

References

External links
 Official Website
2006 AMSE Winners and Finalists

Children's magazines published in the United States
Defunct magazines published in the United States
Magazines established in 2001
Magazines disestablished in 2006
Magazines published in New York City
Martha Stewart Living Omnimedia
Quarterly magazines published in the United States